Byron Gallimore (born in Puryear, Tennessee) is an American record producer known for more than two decades of work in the field of country music. He has worked with artists Tim McGraw, Faith Hill, Sugarland, Lee Ann Womack, and Jo Dee Messina. Faith Hill's 1999 album Breathe won him the Grammy Award for Best Country Album. Gallimore also produced the single "Breathe" from the album.

Biography
Gallimore was born in Puryear, Tennessee. He earned an engineering degree from Murray State University. He played in rock 'n' roll and country cover bands from the age of 11 and that led him to songwriting and recording.

In 1980, he won the Music City Song Festival songwriting contest with the single "No Ordinary Woman", which was released that year on the Little Giant record label, peaking at No. 93 on the Billboard country singles charts. He moved to Nashville in 1986.

Gallimore has produced 12 of Tim McGraw's albums, 11 of which debuted at No. 1 on the Billboard charts. He has produced more than 50 No. 1 Country Radio singles.

He won a Grammy Award for Best Country Album in 2001 for Faith Hill's album Breathe and produced the single "Breathe" from the album. He also produced the song "Stay" which won a Best Country Performance by a Duo or Group with Vocals Grammy for Sugarland in 2008. Billboard named him Producer of the Year in 2000, 2001 and 2002.

In addition to Tim McGraw, Faith Hill, and Sugarland, Gallimore has produced Lee Ann Womack, Brooks & Dunn, Martina McBride, Jo Dee Messina, Jessica Andrews, Randy Travis, Phil Vassar, Terri Clark, and American Idol runner-up Lauren Alaina.

Gallimore launched a record label in 2012 called Streamsound Records with Jim Wilkes. The roster includes Jaida Dreyer, who released her debut album I Am Jaida Dreyer in early 2013, Austin Webb and Dakota Bradley. Streamsound Records is based in Nashville, Tennessee.

Awards and nominations

References

Grammy Award winners
Living people
Year of birth missing (living people)
People from Henry County, Tennessee
American country record producers